Nychia is a genus of true bugs belonging to the family Notonectidae.

The species of this genus are found in Southern Africa and Australia.

Species:

Nychia infuscata 
Nychia limpida 
Nychia malayana 
Nychia marshalli 
Nychia sappho

References

Notonectidae